Sugarcane is the debut EP by Nigerian singer Tiwa Savage. It was released on September 22, 2017, by Mavin Records and 323 Entertainment. The EP features collaborations with producers and guest artists such as Wizkid, Spellz, Baby Fresh, Maleek Berry and P2J. It explores themes of love and was recorded in English and Yoruba. Sugarcane was supported by two singles: "All Over" and "Ma Lo". It was nominated for Best Album of the Year at the 2018 Nigeria Entertainment Awards.

Background
In an interview with The Fader magazine, Tiwa Savage said she did not have any plans to release the EP. However, she decided to put out the project after recording so much music for her upcoming album. Savage said she titled the EP Sugarcane because the songs sounded sweet to her. Sugarcane explores themes relating to love, including the journey of wanting love, needing love, finding love, and giving love. It is a mixture of Afropop, funk, house, pop, R&B and trap.

Composition
The EP's title track "Sugarcane" is a tribute to a man with whom she has an admiration for. Wilfred Okiche described the song as "fun, fast and filthy". "All Over" depicts a sexually submissive woman; the song is composed of watered-down lyrics and evokes the need to dance. The highlife-inspired track "Ma Lo" is a torrid romance track. "Get it Now" has an African-infused homogenous sound. The Bubblegum pop track "Me and You" features dembow rhythm and draws comparisons to Beyonce's "XO". The P2J-produced track "Hold Me Down" contains a Bollywood-inspired riff.

Singles and other releases
The EP's lead single "All Over" was released on April 2, 2017. Debola Abimbolu of Native magazine said the song is essentially about Savage's romantic feelings and likened its hook to Kcee's "Tonight". The music video for "All Over" was shot and directed in Miami by Patrick Elis. In it, Savage is seen wearing an Ankara print bikini. In October 2017, Savage told Billboard that the video was shot in four and a half hours.

The Wizkid-assisted track "Ma Lo" was released as the EP's second single on November 3, 2017. Directed by Meji Alabi, the accompanying music video for "Ma Lo" was shot at the New Afrika Shrine. A 40-second teaser clip preceded its release. A Wizkid fan account shared behind-the-scenes clips of the video shoot on October 19, 2017. "Ma Lo" won Best Collabo at The Headies 2018. 

Savage released a colorful music video for the EP's title track "Sugarcane" on December 28, 2017. It was also directed by Meji Alabi. In the video, Savage dances against a colorful backdrop. On February 22, 2018, Savage released the music video for "Get It Now"; it depicts a romance between Savage and a gym trainer. In March 2018, Savage released the Omarion-assisted remix of "Get It Now". The song's music video was directed by Meji Alabi and released in April 2018. It was shot in a fast food restaurant and shows Savage and Omarion exchanging suggestive looks in the presence of their significant other.

Critical reception

Sugarcane received generally positive reviews from music critics. Jim Donnett of TooXclusive praised Savage's songwriting ability and said the EP embodies "traits of rawness and sincerity". A writer for Pulse Nigeria called Sugarcane "less a collection of songs and more a documentation of feelings". Reviewing for 360 Nobs, Wilfred Okiche said Savage "appears to have found her voice and niche" on Sugarcane. 

Oris Aigbokhaevbolo of Music in Africa described the EP as "an efficient package selling all that has put Tiwa Savage on top of the female pop pile: sex appeal, controlled R&B vocal styling and an ease with certain kinds of production." In a review for OkayAfrica, Sabo Kpade commended Savage's songwriting efforts and said the EP has great replay value. Edwin Okolo of Native magazine praised Savage for embracing Afropop and said the genre "is the undercurrent that runs through the entire EP".

Accolades

Track listing

Notes
"Me and You" contains background vocals by Maleek Berry.

Personnel

Tiwatope Savage – primary artist, writer
Ayodeji Balogun – featured artist, writer
Ben’Jamin Obadje – featured artist, production 
Peter Jay – production 
Maleek Shoyebi – production 
Sunday "Baby Fresh" Enejere – production

Release history

References

2017 EPs
2017 debut EPs
Tiwa Savage albums
Albums produced by Maleek Berry
Albums produced by Spellz
Yoruba-language albums